Kip Noble is a Canadian ice hockey coach and former defenseman who was an All-American for Michigan Tech.

Career
Noble came to Michigan Tech in 1986 after wrapping up two high-scoring years of junior hockey. It took him a year of collegiate hockey before he caught up to speed but, in his sophomore season, Noble became the leading scorer from the blueline for the Huskies and remained the team's leading light for three years. Unfortunately for Noble, his time coincided with Michigan Tech being on the decline and the team never produced a winning season with him on the team. Noble's best year came as a senior when he set numerous program records, including most goals and points by a defenseman in a season and became the Huskies' all-time leading defensive scorer.

After graduating, Noble travelled to Europe to begin his professional career, spending ten of the next eleven years in the Netherlands or the United Kingdom. He was one of the leading scorers on three Eredivisie Championship teams (1991, 1993 and 1995), leading Flame Guard Nijmegen in postseason scoring for his second title. After a successful run in the low countries, he won a third league championship with the Cardiff Devils in 1997 and then helped get the Devils and the Sheffield Steelers to three consecutive BISL finals.

Noble returned to British Columbia after the 2001 season and played senior hockey for most of the next twelve years. He played on a Horse Lake Thunder team in 2005 that included former NHL standouts like Theoren Fleury, Gino Odjick and Sasha Lakovic. He won two Allan Cups, during this time along with several league championships. After finishing his playing career in 2012 he became a junior hockey coach in the Penticton area.

Noble was inducted into the Michigan Tech Athletic Hall of Fame in 2018.

Statistics

Regular season and playoffs

Allan Cup

Awards and honors

References

External links

1968 births
Living people
Ice hockey people from British Columbia
People from Dawson Creek
Canadian ice hockey defencemen
Michigan Tech Huskies men's ice hockey players
AHCA Division I men's ice hockey All-Americans
Detroit Falcons (CoHL) players
Nijmegen Tigers players
Tilburg Trappers players
Durham Wasps players
Cardiff Devils players
Sheffield Steelers players
Canadian expatriate ice hockey players in the United States
Canadian expatriate ice hockey players in the Netherlands
Canadian expatriate ice hockey players in Wales
Canadian expatriate ice hockey players in England